The Early Years is a compilation album from Scottish singer-songwriter Donovan. It was released in the United Kingdom in March 1993 (Dojo EarlD 13) and the United States in October 1994.

History
In 1993, Dojo Records released another compilation of Donovan's 1965 Pye Records recordings entitled The Early Years.  The compilation was released in the United States by Castle the following year.

Track listing
All tracks by Donovan Leitch, except where noted.

"Catch the Wind" – 2:56
"Why Do You Treat Me Like You Do" – 2:57
"Cuttin' Out" – 2:19
"Gold Watch Blues" (Mick Softley) – 2:32
"Colours" – 2:45
"Do You Hear Me Now" (Bert Jansch) – 1:48
"Turquoise" – 3:30
"Hey Gyp (Dig the Slowness)" – 3:11
"Circus of Sour" (traditional; arranged by Donovan) – 1:51
"Sunny Goodge Street" – 2:56
"Josie" – 3:25
"The Little Tin Soldier" (Shawn Phillips) – 2:58
"Remember the Alamo" (Jane Bowers) – 3:04
"Ballad of a Crystal Man" – 3:50

References

External links
 The Early Years – Donovan Unofficial Site

1993 compilation albums
Donovan compilation albums